Yan Jiaqi (born December 25, 1942) is a Chinese political scientist and dissident.

Biography
Yan was born on 25 December 1942 in Wujin District, Changzhou, Jiangsu, during the Chinese Civil War. In 1959, he entered the University of Science and Technology of China, and then became the director of the Institute of Political Research of the Chinese Academy of Social Sciences, where he published several essays and papers on political reform. In 1986, he published a "theory of leadership". His most famous book, written in collaboration with his wife Gao Gao, was Turbulent Decade: A History of the Cultural Revolution.

He became a political advisor of Chinese Premier Zhao Ziyang during the 1980s, and was one of the leading intellectuals supporting the student movement in 1989. After the 1989 Tiananmen Square protests and massacre, he fled to Paris, France, where he participated in forming the Federation for a Democratic China and was elected the federation's first president. He was expelled from the Communist Party of China in 1991, while in exile.

He is a member of the Chinese Constitutional Reform Association and has suggested the formation of a Federal Republic of China.

Jiaqi is one of three subjects in the feature documentary The Exiles (2022) which won the Grand Jury Prize for Best Documentary at the Sundance Film Festival.

Bibliography
Books written in Chinese translated into English

Turbulent Decade Co-authored with Gao Gao, translated by D.W.Y. Kwok. University of Hawaii Press, Honolulu, 1996
Toward a Democratic China translated by David S. K. Hong and Denis C. Mair. University of Hawaii Press, Honolulu, 1992
Yan Jiaqi and China's Struggle For Democracy, translated by David Bachman and Dali L. Yang. M.E.Sharpe Inc. 1992

References

External links
Alliance Introduction

1942 births
Writers from Changzhou
Chinese dissidents
Living people
Charter 08 signatories
1989 Tiananmen Square protests and massacre
University of Science and Technology of China alumni